Weidler (German: variant of Weidner) is a surname. Notable people with the surname include:

 Alfred Weidler (1886–1966), German-born American Hollywood model builder, father of child actress Virginia and saxophonist George
 Charles Weidler, NASCAR racing driver (1952-1953)
 Danny Weidler, Australian journalist
 
 Volker Weidler (born 1962), German racing driver
 Virginia Weidler (1927–1968), American child actress
German-language surnames